Smolniki may refer to:

Smolniki, Brodnica County in Kuyavian-Pomeranian Voivodeship (north-central Poland)
Smolniki, Nakło County in Kuyavian-Pomeranian Voivodeship (north-central Poland)
Smolniki, Podlaskie Voivodeship (north-east Poland)
Smolniki, Konin County in Greater Poland Voivodeship (west-central Poland)
Smolniki, Ostrzeszów County in Greater Poland Voivodeship (west-central Poland)
Smolniki, Lubusz Voivodeship (west Poland)
Smolniki, Pomeranian Voivodeship (north Poland)
Smolniki, Kartuzy County in Pomeranian Voivodeship (north Poland)
Smolniki, Starogard County in Pomeranian Voivodeship (north Poland)
Smolniki, Warmian-Masurian Voivodeship (north Poland)
Smolniki, West Pomeranian Voivodeship (north-west Poland)